Bisconni Music is a Pakistani television music show which features live studio-recorded music performances of musicians across the Pakistan. The show is first of its kind by a local company Bisconni. Saad Hayat is the music producer of the show. The show debuted with its first episode airing on 1 January 2021.

Artists 
The show features a diverse line-up of musicians from across Pakistan.

 Ahmed Jahanzeb
 Shuja Haider
 Natasha Baig
 Sajid and Zeeshan
 Ustad Ashiq Ali Chand
 Mughal-e-Funk
 Haroon Shahid
 Ali Khan
 Mirage
 Taha Hussain
 Natasha Humera Ejaz
 Ali Tarik
 Sinnan Fazwani
 Nimra Rafiq
 Alycia Dias
 Mahnoor Altaf
 Saad Hayat

See also 

 Music of Pakistan
 Coke Studio
 Nescafé Basement
 Velo Sound Station
 Uth Records
 Acoustic Station

References

External links 
 Bisconni Music on YouTube

Pakistani music television series
Pop music television series
Pakistani music
2021 in Pakistani television